JLS are a British 4-piece boyband.

JLS may also refer to:
 Jamie Lynn Spears, Britney Spears sister
 JLS (album), an album by Jodio Loco Sucio
 .jls, an extension for Lossless JPEG files
 Jane Lathrop Stanford Middle School, a middle school in Palo Alto, California
 Jarcho-Levin Syndrome
 Journal of Libertarian Studies, a scholarly journal published by the Ludwig von Mises Institute and Lew Rockwell
 The Java Language Specification, the specification for the programming language Java.